Bystrany is a village and municipality in the Spišská Nová Ves District in the Košice Region of central-eastern Slovakia.

History
In historical records the village was first mentioned in 1268.

Geography
The village lies at an altitude of 415 metres and covers an area of 7.819 km².
It has a population of about 2740 people.

Genealogical resources

The records for genealogical research are available at the state archive "Statny Archiv in Levoca, Slovakia"

 Roman Catholic church records (births/marriages/deaths): 1779-1896 (parish A)

See also
 List of municipalities and towns in Slovakia

External links
http://en.e-obce.sk/obec/bystrany/bystrany.html
https://web.archive.org/web/20071217080336/http://www.statistics.sk/mosmis/eng/run.html
http://www.bystrany.ou.sk
Surnames of living people in Bystrany

Villages and municipalities in Spišská Nová Ves District